Salvia smithii is an aromatic perennial plant that is native to Sichuan province in China, found growing on riverbanks, valleys, and hillsides at  elevation.

Inflorescences are 2-flowered verticillasters in loose many branched raceme-panicles.

Notes

smithii
Flora of China